Vermejo Park Ranch, Vermejo Ranch, or Vermejo, is a  nature reserve and guest ranch in northeastern New Mexico and southern Colorado. Ted Turner Reserves, the luxury hospitality company founded by Ted Turner, includes conservation research and ecosystem restoration along with guest operations. The ranch produces significant quantities of coalbed methane, a type of natural gas.

History
Vermejo Park was originally part of the Maxwell Land Grant. After Vermejo Park went through several owners in the late-19th century, William H. Bartlett (1850–1918) of Chicago, Illinois bought  from the Maxwell Land Grant Company in 1902. Bartlett evicted a number of Mexicans living at Vermejo Park. He hired close friend and Chicago architect, Joseph Lyman Silsbee to help him make improvements, including three large residences (including the main Casa Grande) and a power plant. He re-introduced elk to the park and built and stocked several lakes with trout.

Bartlett died at the ranch in 1918 and his sons, who had managed the ranch, died within two years.

A syndicate of New York, St. Louis, and Chicago businessmen took an option to buy the ranch and organized the Vermejo Park Club, selling memberships to Tex Austin, Billy Mitchell, Amon Carter, and the Frederick Guest family. A member of the Guest family shot an elk which at the time was the ninth largest in the world; it is now on display at the Museum of Natural History in New York. The syndicate, however, was unable to raise the US$1.8 million asking price and the original club was disbanded.

In 1926, Los Angeles Times baron Harry Chandler bought the property from Bartlett. In 1927 Chandler and his investors opened a new Vermejo Park Club attracting Will Rogers, Cecil B. DeMille, Douglas Fairbanks, Mary Pickford, Harvey Firestone and Herbert Hoover. The club was disbanded during the Great Depression, although ranching operations continued.

He used the ranch for recreation as well as cattle ranching. On December 23, 1955, the large middle guest house burned and the stables were renovated to become the ranch's main social and dining area now called "The Stables".

Pennzoil continued cattle ranching and expanded the facilities for guests. In 1996 Ted Turner purchased the property from Pennzoil, put emphasis on managing wildlife. He used much of the former cattle pasturage for bison, traditionally called buffalo in North America. Ralphie V, of the Ralphie mascot of the Colorado Buffaloes, was born there. After living there for awhile, he decided to open it to paying guests.

Coal, natural gas, and oil

Vermejo has large hydrocarbon resources estimated to consist of a 300-year reserve of bituminous coal, trillions of cubic feet of natural gas and unknown quantities of oil.

Coal mining on land later belonging to Vermejo began by 1880. Seven coal mining settlements and mines were established on the ranch: Blossburg, Brilliant, Tin Pan Canyon, and Swastiks in Dillon Canyon and Gardiner, Koehler, and Waldron canyon nearby. The coal mines employed 3,563 miners in 1911. These miners consisted primarily of local Hispanic workers and many recent immigrants to the United States, especially from Italy and Greece. Other coal mines were located just outside the boundaries of Vermejo, notably at Dawson, New Mexico where in 1913, 263 miners were killed in the worst mining disaster ever to happen in the United States. Coal production slowly declined to insignificant levels and ceased altogether in 2002 due to the high cost of coal extraction. Land polluted or disturbed by the coal mining is still being reclaimed.

When Pennzoil sold the property to Turner in 1996, it retained mineral rights.  Turner, however, was able to impose upon the company strict environmental controls for natural gas extraction.  In 1999 Pennzoil sold its mineral rights to El Paso Natural Gas. By 2011, there were 970 natural gas wells on the property, 840 of them in New Mexico and 130 in Colorado.  Although touting the coalbed methane production at Vermejo, as environmentally friendly, El Paso Natural Gas ran into public opposition when it attempted to exploit natural gas resources in the neighboring publicly owned area of Valle Vidal.  In 2007, Congress withdrew the 101,794 acres of Valle Vidal from energy development and mining.

Description and geography

Vermejo, just west of the city of Raton, is the biggest component of Turner's ranch empire of  that consistently keeps him in the top ten of private landowners in the United States. It lies mostly in western Colfax County, New Mexico, but smaller portions extend into northeastern Taos County, New Mexico as well as southwestern Las Animas County and southeastern Costilla County in Colorado.

An eight-mile long, north-south ridge with four summits above  including Big Costilla Peak form the western boundary.

Most of Vermejo is drained by the Canadian River and its tributary, Vermejo Creek. The Canadian is part of the Mississippi River drainage basin. A small portion in the western part of the ranch, the East Fork of Costilla Creek, drains into the Rio Grande.  Costilla Reservoir is on the East Fork of Costilla Creek. About 20 lakes, both natural and artificial, are scattered around the higher elevations.

Vegetation and climate
Vermejo, has the typical life zones of the southern Rocky Mountains. Below  Great Plains grassland and steppe vegetation is dominant. From  to  Piñon pine-juniper woodland is common, especially on south facing slopes. Grassland and meadows are interspersed with forest at all elevations.

The climate of Vermejo is mostly semi-arid. The lower elevations receive an average of 15 or 16 (400 mm) inches of precipitation annually, mostly in summer. Middle and higher elevations receive about 22 inches (550 mm) of precipitation annually. Temperatures vary depending upon elevation and slope exposure with a wide range between the lower and higher elevations. Snow accumulation is significant during winter at higher elevations.

Wildlife
Game animals include 6,000 to 8,000 elk, 3,000 to 4,000 mule deer, pronghorn, 1,400 bison, black bear, cougars, Rocky Mountain bighorn sheep and Merriam's turkey (a subspecies of the wild turkey). Game fish include several species of trout including the Rio Grande cutthroat which survives only in a few small streams in its former range.

Conservation 
The black-footed ferret was declared extinct in 1979, but a remnant population was found in Wyoming. In cooperation with the U.S. Fish and Wildlife Service, Vermejo introduced ferrets to the reserve in 2008, with the goal of establishing a population of 120 ferrets.

Vermejo also has an agreement with the Fish and Wildlife Service to help conserve the Rio Grande cutthroat trout in the small headwater streams in which it lives.  The Rio Grande cutthroat is declining in numbers and is only found in about 10 percent of its former range. Vermejo is also cooperating with Philmont Scout Ranch in restoring Ponil and Bonito Creeks to conditions in which they can support trout populations

Vermejo is improving the quality of its ponderosa pine forest by selective cutting and controlled burning and encouraging the expansion of declining quaking aspen forests. Research on various factors influencing the wildlife on the property and reclamation of land impacted by abandoned coal mines are on-going projects.

Infrastructure
The Cimarron Solar Facility on  produces 30 megawatts of electric power, sufficient for 9,000 homes.

References

Further reading
 (Master's thesis)

External links

Buildings and structures in Colfax County, New Mexico
Buildings and structures in Taos County, New Mexico
Geography of Colfax County, New Mexico
Geography of Costilla County, Colorado
Geography of Las Animas County, Colorado
Geography of Taos County, New Mexico
Ranches in Colorado
Ranches in New Mexico
Nature reserves in New Mexico